Donji Bešpelj is a village in the municipality of Jajce, Bosnia and Herzegovina, known for non-conflictual life of Bosniak muslim and Croat catholic inhabitants.

Demographics 
According to the 2013 census, its population was 536.

References

Populated places in Jajce